Himmelgeist is a quarter (Stadtteil) of Düsseldorf, part of Borough 9. It is an old village, which is dominated by agriculture until today. Himmelgeist lies by the river Rhine, neighbouring to Flehe and Itter.

It is a small suburb of Düsseldorf.
Himguis was mentioned first time in a document of 904.
Himmelgeist had many problems with the neighboring river Rhine throughout its history.

Gallery

References

Urban districts and boroughs of Düsseldorf